Giggle, Giggle, Quack is a children's book by Doreen Cronin, illustrated by Betsy Lewin and a sequel/spin-off to Click, Clack, Moo: Cows That Type. Published by Simon and Schuster, it tells the story of Farmer Brown's younger brother Bob, who is farm-sitting for the vacationing Farmer Brown. Farmer Brown leaves a to-do list for Bob, but Duck is able to get hold of it and write his own list.

In 2004, a video based on the book won the Carnegie Medal for Excellence in Children's Video.

Backstory

Giggle, Giggle, Quack is a sequel featuring the barnyard animals first seen in Cronin and Lewin's Click, Clack, Moo: Cows That Type, which was awarded the Caldecott Medal in 2001.

Plot
Farmer Brown leaves his brother, Bob in charge of his farm while he is on vacation. Farmer Brown tells his brother to follow instructions and that everything should be fine. Duck gets a hold of a pencil Farmer Brown throws on the ground, later Bob finds reads the first note that says, "Tuesday night is Pizza night. (Not the frozen kind!). The hens prefer anchovies". The next day, another note has Bob wash the pigs. Farmer Brown calls his brother and suggests his brother to keep Duck inside the house, the next night, the animals sneak inside the living room to watch "the Sound of MOOSIC" for movie night, but Farmer Brown finds out about when he calls and immediately comes back early from his vacation.

References

2002 children's books
Children's fiction books
American picture books